The Play-offs of the 2002 Fed Cup Americas Zone Group I were the final stages of the Group I Zonal Competition involving teams from the Americas. Those that qualified for this stage placed first and second in their respective pools.

The four teams were then paired up the team from a different placing of the other group for a play-off tie, with the winners being promoted to the World Group Play-offs.

Canada vs. Uruguay

  advanced to the World Group Play-offs, where they were drawn against . They lost 0–5, and thus were relegated back to Group I for 2003.

Mexico vs. Colombia

  advanced to the World Group Play-offs, where they were drawn against . However, the Japanese withdrew from their tie citing security concerns over the Colombian armed conflict. Colombia thus advanced automatically to the World Group.

See also
Fed Cup structure

References

External links
 Fed Cup website

2002 Fed Cup Americas Zone